The Canton of Sancergues is a former canton situated in the Cher département and in the Centre region of France. It was disbanded following the French canton reorganisation which came into effect in March 2015. It consisted of 18 communes, which joined the new canton of Avord in 2015. It had 7,530 inhabitants (2012).

Geography 
An area of farming and forestry in the valley of the river Loire, in the eastern part of the arrondissement of Bourges centred on the town of Sancergues. The altitude varies from 147m at Herry to 269m at Chaumoux-Marcilly, with an average altitude of 182m.

The canton comprised 18 communes:

Argenvières
Beffes
La Chapelle-Montlinard
Charentonnay
Chaumoux-Marcilly
Couy
Étréchy
Garigny
Groises
Herry
Jussy-le-Chaudrier
Lugny-Champagne
Marseilles-lès-Aubigny
Précy
Saint-Léger-le-Petit
Saint-Martin-des-Champs
Sancergues
Sévry

Population

See also 
 Arrondissements of the Cher department
 Cantons of the Cher department
 Communes of the Cher department

References

Sancergues
2015 disestablishments in France
States and territories disestablished in 2015